Mary Anne Criddle, née Alabaster (1805 – 1880) was an English painter.

She was born at Chapel House, Holywell Mount in Shoreditch, East London. She became an oil painter studying under John Hayter. She married Harry C. Criddle in 1836 and continued to work after her marriage, though after her brother died in 1840 she took on his three sons and in 1844 her own son Percy was born. She took up Watercolour painting in 1846 when her doctor told her oil painting was bad for her health. She became successful with these at shows at the Royal Academy as well and in 1849 became a member of the Society of Painters in Water Colours. She is also known for sculpture.

From 1852-1854 suffered partial blindness and stopped working, but was still working when her biography was written by Ellen Creathorne Clayton in 1876.

References

 Mary Anne Criddle with sketchbook in hand, 1864 photograph in the National Portrait Gallery, London

1805 births
1880 deaths
Artists from London
19th-century English painters
English women painters
19th-century British women artists
19th-century English women